is a Japanese footballer currently playing as a goalkeeper for Hokkaido Consadole Sapporo.

Career statistics

Club
.

Notes

References

External links

1999 births
Living people
Japanese footballers
Japan youth international footballers
Hosei University alumni
Association football goalkeepers
J1 League players
Hokkaido Consadole Sapporo players